Financial City East Station is a metro station in Chengdu, Sichuan, China. It was opened on December 18, 2020, with the opening of Line 6 and Line 9.

References

Chengdu Metro stations
Railway stations in China opened in 2020